Phir Bhi Apna Hai (Even Then He's Ours) is a 1946 Indian Hindi-language film. It was released in 1946. The film was directed by Raja Nene for Venus Pictures under the Charolia Productions banner and was produced by A. V. Charolia. Music was composed by Ramchandra Pal with lyrics by Mukhram Sharma Ashant. The cast included Nalini Jaywant, Karan Dewan, Jagdish Sethi, Saroj Borkar, Kusum Deshpande
and Vasant Thengdi.

Following her marriage to Virendra Desai, son of Chimanbhai Desai of Sagar Movietone in 1945, Nalini Jaywant had a hiatus of nearly three years from films. Phir Bhi Apna Hai was the only Jaywant film released as it was in making over a long period of time.

Cast
 Nalini Jaywant
 Karan Dewan
 Saroj Borkar
 Jagdish Sethi
 Kusum Deshpande
 Vasant Thengdi
 Paresh Bannerjee
 Sunalini Devi

Soundtrack
Music was composed by Ramchandra Pal with lyrics by Mukhram Sharma Ashant.

Song List

References

External links
 

1946 films
1940s Hindi-language films
Indian fantasy films
1940s fantasy films
Indian black-and-white films